The Thomas Gooding Water Tank House near Shoshone, Idaho, United States, is an elevated water tank structure that was built of stone in 1919 by sheep rancher and stonemason Bill Darrah. It was built for Thomas Gooding. The elevated water tank is supported on five I-beams. Originally a windmill was atop the structure to lift the water, but is no longer present.

It was listed on the National Register of Historic Places in 1983.

References

Agricultural buildings and structures on the National Register of Historic Places
Buildings and structures completed in 1919
Buildings and structures in Lincoln County, Idaho
Agricultural buildings and structures on the National Register of Historic Places in Idaho
National Register of Historic Places in Lincoln County, Idaho